Ali Bin Abdur Rahman Al Huthaify (born 22 May 1947) (Arabic; علي بن عبد الرحمن الحذيفي) is a Saudi imam and khateeb of the Al-Masjid an-Nabawi, and a former Imam of Quba Mosque. His style of reciting the Qur’an in a slow and deep tune is widely recognised.

Life and career
In 1972 he graduated with a Bachelor of Laws degree from the Imam Muhammad bin Saud Islamic University. In 1975 he received a master’s degree in Islamic law from Al-Azhar University, and then he took his doctorate from the same university.

He was an imam and Khateeb of Quba Mosque during 1978. 
In 1979 he became an imam of Al-Masjid al-Nabawi. 
In 1981, during the month of Ramadan, he was appointed as imam for the Tarawih prayers in Masjid al-Haram and then he went back to Great Mosque of Medina where he continues to lead prayers.

References

External links
 archive.org
 Bilal365-Abdul-Rahman-Hudhaify
 Kalamullah
 All'quran
 Quranic Audio
 Islamfactory

1947 births
Living people
Saudi Arabian Quran reciters
Islam and antisemitism
Islam and other religions
Saudi Arabian imams
Saudi Arabian Muslims
Muslim scholars of Islamic jurisprudence
20th-century imams
21st-century imams
Imam Muhammad ibn Saud Islamic University alumni